Connor Rains (born March 25, 1992) is an American football offensive tackle who is currently a free agent. He played college football at Wyoming. He was signed by the Denver Broncos as an undrafted free agent in 2015.

Professional career
On May 2, following the 2015 NFL Draft, the Denver Broncos signed Rains and eight other undrafted free agents to contracts. On August 2, he was waived by the Broncos due to an injury to his plantar fascia.

References

External links
 Wyoming Cowboys bio
 Denver Broncos bio

Living people
1992 births
People from Placerville, California
Wyoming Cowboys football players
Denver Broncos players
American football offensive tackles